Black Mass Krakow 2004 is a live concert DVD by the Norwegian black metal band Gorgoroth. It was released by Metal Mind on 9 June 2008 in Europe and on 8 July 2008 in the US. The DVD is of the band's controversial 2004 concert that was filmed in a TV studio in Kraków, Poland. The DVD also includes live footage from the Full Force Festival Leipzig 2000, band biography, discography, photo gallery, desktop images and web links, and is compatible with Dolby Digital 5.1 Surround Sound.

Controversy

The concert featured sheep heads on stakes, "crucified" nude models, Satanic symbols and eighty litres of sheeps' blood. The band was criticised for violating Polish anti-blasphemy laws as well as Polish animal rights laws. A police investigation took place with allegations of a religious offence (which is prosecutable under Polish law) and cruelty to animals. Though these charges were considered, the band was not charged as it was ruled that they were unaware of the fact that what they were doing was illegal, although the concert organiser was eventually fined 10,000zł in 2007, as he knew about it and neither informed the band that it was against the law nor intervened. The whole controversy led to the band being dropped from the roster of the Nuclear Blast Tour and the footage of the concert being confiscated by the police.

Track listing

Personnel
 Gaahl – vocals
 Infernus – guitar
 King ov Hell – bass guitar
 Kvitrafn – drums
 Apollyon – guitar

See also
 Gorgoroth discography

References

Gorgoroth albums
Black metal controversies
2008 live albums
2008 video albums
Live video albums
Metal Mind Productions video albums